Avalon School is a project-based charter middle school and high school in Saint Paul, Minnesota, United States, located at 700 Glendale Street. As a project-based school, students meet their academic graduation requirements through a combination of independent projects, group projects, and seminars. Individual students' schedules vary depending on the seminars they are enrolled in and the activities they are involved with. Students spend a significant part each day working independently on projects. The school has a flat organizational structure with no principal or director in a position of power. The staff members work collaboratively to manage the school.

The school moved to its new Glendale Street location in 2007, 6 years after it was founded in 2001. The new location has expanded throughout the years adding a new middle school wing and office section, replacing parts of the surrounding buildings previously owned by Take Action MN.

Advisors
In keeping with the non-hierarchical organizational structure, students refer to teachers as 'advisors' and students and staff are all on a first-name basis. Some of the advisors are leaders of a homeroom-like group of students, called advisories. Advisories are housed in classroom-sized areas including both open spaces and other advisory spaces that are separated from each other by cubicle walls. Advisories are spaces where students work on independent projects or other assignments for seminars. Each student has their desk space which they can decorate as they please.

Seminars
Seminars are classes specifically tailored to Minnesota graduation standards although they are not usually the traditional "Intro to Literature" style courses. Instead, the advisors get creative making classes such as "Rights of Passage", "Southern Women Writers", "World Genocide", or "1950s Literature". There is usually a small class size, although some classes (such as Economics) can become quite large. They are generally discussion based and allow the students to have quite a bit of control. Math seminars are offered for Algebra 1&2, Geometry, and Advanced Topics. Independent math is an option using the accelerated math program, PSEO, or other proposed method.

Projects
Avalon is project-based, meaning the focus of the student's work is independent projects. If a student has an idea for a project, he or she must fill out a proposal form and rubric, get parent approval, and present their idea to their advisor. When the project has been completed, the student must do a reflection—a process of answering questions about the development of a student's project, what he or she learned and how this helps the world/community. It is then taken back to the advisor, who asks the student questions and uses a rubric to assess the grade.

Student organizations and activities
Avalon has a number of organizations and activities, including: the Library, the GSA, AAH, Congress, Green Team, the mentor program (where older students mentor new students), a peer mediator program, and Tech Committee. There are also activities that do not last throughout the school year, like drama and prom committee. Avalon won a national Promising Practices Award from the CEP for its Feminist Club.

Avalon Middle School
Avalon added a middle school, which accepts students in grades 6 through 8.

References

External links
Avalon School
 

Charter schools in Minnesota
Educational institutions established in 2001
High schools in Saint Paul, Minnesota
Public high schools in Minnesota
2001 establishments in Minnesota